Pieper is a Belgian carmaker.

Pieper may also refer to:

 Pieper (surname)
 Anciens Etablissements Pieper, Belgian arms manufacturer